Song Weilong (born December 9, 1989 in Shenyang, Liaoning) is a Chinese male short track speed skater. He competed at the 2010 Winter Olympics in the 1500m and 5000m relay events.

External links
Song Weilong at ISU

References

1989 births
Living people
Chinese male short track speed skaters
Olympic short track speed skaters of China
Short track speed skaters at the 2010 Winter Olympics
Asian Games medalists in short track speed skating
Asian Games gold medalists for China
Short track speed skaters at the 2011 Asian Winter Games
Medalists at the 2011 Asian Winter Games
21st-century Chinese people